Gastrocutaneous syndrome is a rare autosomal dominant cutaneous condition characterized by multiple lentigines.

See also 
 Gardner's syndrome
 List of cutaneous conditions

References

External links 

Genodermatoses
Syndromes